Tim Coen is a retired American football coach. He was the head coach at Salve Regina University in Newport, Rhode Island building that program from the ground up. He served as a coach that competed at the club level in 1992 and then at the varsity level from 1993 to 1999.

After stepping away from college coaching, he was a highly successful high school coach at La Salle Academy in Providence, Rhode Island.

Head coaching record

References

Year of birth missing (living people)
Living people
Salve Regina Seahawks football coaches
High school football coaches in Rhode Island